Khangarid is a Mongolian professional football club from Erdenet, competing in the Mongolian National Premier League.

Current squad

Honours
 Mongolian Premier League: (4)
 Winner: 2001, 2003, 2004, 2010
 Runners-Up: 2002, 2005, 2007, 2013
 Third place: 2014, 2019
 Mongolia Cup: (7)
 Winner: 2002, 2003, 2004, 2007, 2013,
 Runner-up: 2008, 2014

References

Football clubs in Mongolia
1996 establishments in Mongolia
Association football clubs established in 1996